Larissa Rose Crummer (born 10 January 1996) is an Australian professional soccer player who plays as a forward for Brisbane Roar in the W-League and the Australia women's national team, also known as the Matildas. She previously played for W-League clubs Melbourne City, Brisbane Roar FC, Sydney FC, and Newcastle Jets.

Early life
Raised in Tewantin, Queensland a suburb located in Australia's Sunshine Coast Region, Crummer began playing football at the age of 5.

Crummer scored 12 goals at the national titles in 2011 and was a member of the Brisbane Premier League-winning team Peninsula Power FC the same year. 
She was a student at the Kawana Waters State College Football School of Excellence.

Club career

Sydney FC 
At the age of 16, Crummer made her professional debut for Sydney FC during the 2012–13 season helping the team win the league championship playing primarily as a defender.

Brisbane Roar 
The following season she returned to Queensland to play for Brisbane Roar for the 2013–14 season. She made 13 appearances for the club and scored one goal. The Roar finished fourth during the regular season with a  record. The team advanced to the semi-finals where they defeated Canberra United 2–1 but were defeated 2–0 by Melbourne Victory in the Grand Final.

Crummer returned to the Roar for the 2014 season and made ten appearances for the club. The team finished in sixth place during the regular season.

Melbourne City 
In September 2015, Crummer signed with Melbourne City.
During the team's first match of the season against Sydney FC, she scored the team's first-ever goal in the 11th minute and followed with another in the last six minutes of the first half for a 6–0 win. 
On 21 November, she scored a brace to help defeat her former team Brisbane Roar 4–0.

In May 2016 Crummer signed on loan at Victorian NPLW club Alamein FC.

She returned to Melbourne City for the 2016–17 W-League campaign, but after making only three appearances her season was cut short by a foot injury in January 2017.

Crummer returned to Melbourne City for the 2017–18 W-League season. She appeared in 8 games and scored 3 goals as Melbourne City won their third consecutive W-League Championship.

Seattle Reign FC 
In January 2017, Crummer signed with Seattle Reign FC, effective upon the conclusion of the 2016–17 W-League season. Due to injury she only appeared in four games for Seattle, scoring one goal. She was released by the club in February 2018.

Newcastle Jets
On 20 August 2018 Crummer signed a one-year contract to join the Newcastle Jets for the 2018-19 W-League season. Despite deciding in October 2019, to rehabilitate from a leg break with Newcastle Jets, a month later, it was announced she would miss the 2019–20 W-League season.

Return to Brisbane Roar
In February 2021, Crummer returned to Brisbane Roar.

International career
At the age of 14, Crummer was called up to the Young Matildas. She made her debut for the Matildas and scored her first international goal against the Netherlands in March 2015. The same year, she was the youngest player on the team at the 2015 FIFA Women's World Cup in Canada where she made two appearances for Australia.

Crummer was again called in to the Matildas for the 2016 AFC Women's Olympic Qualifying Tournament, but she suffered a knee injury during a training match prior to the competition and was replaced on the squad by Ashleigh Sykes. She recovered in time to be named to the Matildas' Olympic squad, where she made two appearances as a substitute.

Crummer was named to the Australian squad for the 2018 AFC Women's Asian Cup, but she did not appear in any games. Australia finished Runner-up to Japan, and qualified for the 2019 FIFA Women's World Cup.

Career statistics

International goals

Honours

Club
Sydney FC
 W-League Championship: 2012–13

Melbourne City
 W-League Championship: 2015–16, 2016–17
 W-League Premiership: 2015–16

Individual
 W-League Golden Boot: 2015–16
 W-League Young Player of the Year: 2015–16

References

External links

 
 
 Matildas player profile
 Melbourne City player profile 
 Brisbane Roar player profile 

1996 births
Living people
Australian women's soccer players
Sydney FC (A-League Women) players
Sportswomen from Queensland
Soccer players from Queensland
Brisbane Roar FC (A-League Women) players
Melbourne City FC (A-League Women) players
OL Reign players
Newcastle Jets FC (A-League Women) players
National Women's Soccer League players
2015 FIFA Women's World Cup players
Footballers at the 2016 Summer Olympics
A-League Women players
Australia women's international soccer players
Women's association football forwards
Olympic soccer players of Australia
Australian expatriate sportspeople in the United States
Expatriate women's soccer players in the United States
Australian expatriate women's soccer players